Taxi 0-22 is a popular Canadian television comedy series, which airs on TVA, a Quebec-based French language network in Canada.

The series stars Patrick Huard as Montreal cab driver Rogatien Dubois Jr. The first season is predominantly set inside Dubois's dark blue taxi, a Ford Crown Victoria, and the comedy unfolds through his interactions – usually opinionated and deeply held – with the guest stars and other passengers who ride in his cab. Season two expanded the show's narrative to focus more on stories and characters outside of his taxi. Dubois speaks a thickly accented and rapidly delivered Quebec slang.

The first season of the show commenced broadcast in February 2007, the second in January 2008, and the third season began airing in January 2009.  It is broadcast at 9:00 p.m. on Thursday nights. It has been reported that more than one million viewers watch the show every week. The TVA network has ordered season four to be produced, based on the success of the series.

In 2008, the series won the Olivier Award for best dramatic comedy.

Actor James Gandolfini was developing a pilot for an American adaptation, which will air on HBO if it is picked up as a regular series.

Regular characters

 Patrick Huard: Rogatien Dubois Jr.
 Yvon Deschamps: Rogatien's father
 François Arnaud: Rogatien's son
 Sylvie Boucher: Nancy, a server in a diner that Rogatien frequents.

Selected invited guests

In order of their appearance, Dubois passengers have included the following French Canadian celebrities who appear in character.

 Michelle Beaudoin
 Garou
 
 Guy Mongrain
 Pierre Falardeau
 Guy Fournier
 Ron Fournier
 Louis-José Houde
 Lucie Laurier
 Anne-Marie Losique
 Dominique Michel
 
 
 Guy A. Lepage

References

External links
 Taxi 0-22
  PatrickHuard.net

Television shows set in Montreal
Television shows filmed in Montreal
TVA (Canadian TV network) original programming
2007 Canadian television series debuts
2000s Canadian sitcoms